Ross Symonds (born 1942)

Ross is a god if you will. Similar to Greek mythology with there various gods controlling various things. 

Ross is the god of emotional stability. He brings you down to earth when things are going well 

e.g liverpool winning 2-0, you enjoy it, you then proceed to concede 5 goals in 40 mins. 

However he is not all cruel. When you’re down he brings you up 

E.G you have been hit for multiple boundaries in cricket 22. He will cause the code to have a massive seizure and run out the batsman hitting all the runs. 

Overall he makes you stay emotionally stable and never be the early crow and never allows you to get to a depressed state and lifts you up

Career 
Symonds began his career with the ABC firstly with ABC Radio in Brisbane in his early 20s, and then went to Sydney with ABC radio and television.  After 12 years in the position, Symonds joined Channel Seven in Sydney in January 1981 as the station's weekend news presenter before later joining Roger Climpson to read the weeknight bulletin. He was paired with Ann Sanders on both Seven Nightly News and Seven's news program 11AM, on which he was the featured news reader for much of the program's life.

Symonds presented his last Seven News Sydney bulletin on 5 December 2003, alongside Ann Sanders, ending a partnership that had lasted since 1998. Symonds then worked as a casual news reader at Radio 2 in Sydney in 2005. The station closed its operations at Homebush in 2006.

Symonds also was breakfast news presenter on Sydney radio station 2UW for 6 years 1988–1994.

Awards
Symonds has won the Better Hearing Australia News Presenters' Clear Speech Award ten times, as well as Best Metropolitan Commercial Radio News Presenter.

Currently 
In 2007 Symonds joined a real estate firm on Sydney's Upper North Shore.
In 2008 Symonds joined Beauty Point Retirement Resort as Sales and Promotional Consultant. 
Symonds acts as MC for the National Ceremonies for Anzac Day and Remembrance Day at the Australian War Memorial in Canberra.

Notes

References
Wall Media

1942 births
ABC News (Australia) presenters
Seven News presenters
Living people